The Hawar Kilis Operations Room is a Syrian rebel coalition formed in the village of Hawar Kilis in April 2016 in the northern Aleppo Governorate on the Syria–Turkey border.

As part of the Syrian Train and Equip Program, many groups in the coalition were supplied with Thuraya satellite phones by the United States.

The operations room forms a large part of the Syrian National Army, which was, with Turkish backing, formed around the Operations Room.

Member groups

 Victory Bloc
Elite Division  (also part of the 2nd Legion)
Army of the Grandsons (also part of the 1st Legion and the Sultan Murad Bloc)
Elite Army c(northern Aleppo branch)
 14th Division
 141st Brigade
 145th Brigade
 Elite Battalion
1st Brigade
Sham Legion
Free North Brigade
Sham Commandos Brigade
Sons of Waer Battalion 
Revolutionaries of Waer Battalion 
Authenticity and Development Front (northern Aleppo branch)
Sultan Murad Division 
Hamza Division 
Army of Grandsons
Al-Mu'tasim Brigade 
 Northern Brigade
 Revolutionary Knights Brigade
 Free Syria Brigade
 Swords of Shahba Brigade
 Manbij Revolutionaries Gathering 
 Soldiers of Mercy Battalion
 Martyr Alaa Abu Zaid Battalion
 Honest Dawn Battalion 
 Sirajuddin Battalion
 Supporters of God Battalion
 Omar Abu al-Hasan Battalion
 Commandos of the Sunna Battalions
 Commandos of Islam Brigade
Zubayr ibn al-Awwam Battalion
Al-Rafidayn al-Aeamila Battalion
Qiba Martyrs Battalion
Northern Commando Battalion
Jarabulus Martyrs Battalion
Martyr Alaa Barir Battalion
23rd Division (northern Aleppo branch)
Sultan Suleyman Shah Brigade
Northern Hawks Brigade
9th Special Forces Division of Aleppo
Mustafa Regiment
1st Commandos Brigade
Sultan Othman Brigade
Free Idlib Army  (northern Aleppo branch)
13th Division
Northern Division
 Mountain Hawks Brigade
1st Division of Aleppo
51st Brigade
  Saladin Brigade (Descendants of Saladin Brigade remnant)
Descendants of Saladin Brigade (until July 2017)
 2nd Army (northern Aleppo branch)
 1st Regiment

Structure
The Hawar Kilis Operations Room consists of three military "blocs": the Victory Bloc, the Sultan Murad Bloc, and the Levant Bloc. At the end of October 2016, a security committee was formed to man checkpoints in the villages and towns it controls. A judicial committee to supervise courts was also established.

History

The coalition took part in the northern Aleppo offensive, beginning with April 2016, and captured several villages in northern Aleppo overlooking al-Rai from ISIL, before entering al-Rai itself. However, ISIL soon launched a large-scale counteroffensive and recaptured most of the villages, including al-Rai.

In early October 2016 the group formed the Akhtarin Military Council which captured several villages and the town of Akhtarin from ISIL as part of the 2016 Dabiq offensive, ending with the capture of Dabiq and several more other villages, linking Mare' with al-Rai.

On 28 October the group formed the "Victory Bloc" operations room during the western al-Bab offensive.

On 28 January 2017, after the formation of Tahrir al-Sham which the Nour al-Din al-Zenki Movement's main branch became part of, the Zenki Movement's northern Aleppo branch working with Hawar Kilis Operations Room defected to the Sham Legion and formed the Revolutionary Knights Brigade.

On 7 June 2017, a unit in the Hawar Kilis Operations Room defected to the Syrian Democratic Forces.

In July 2017, the commander of Liwa Ahfad Saladin, Mahmoud Khallo, declared that the group would not participate in a planned Turkish-led offensive against the SDF in the Afrin Canton and the Shahba region. Following the announcement, the group was arrested and disarmed by the Levant Front and the Turkish Army. After being released soon after, Khallo protested against his unit's treatment and criticized that Turkey was apparently only interested in using the Syrian militias to further its own strategic goals. He also said that Liwa Ahfad Saladin, now without weapons, would set up a political party.

On 26 August 2017, the Hawar Kilis Operations Room condemned Riad al-Asaad and accused him of conspiring with al-Qaeda after he attended a conference held by Tahrir al-Sham in Idlib.

References

Anti-government factions of the Syrian civil war
Anti-ISIL factions in Syria
Military units and factions of the Syrian civil war
Military units and formations established in 2015
Operations rooms of the Syrian civil war
Rebel groups in Syria
Turkish supported militant groups of the Syrian civil war